Nahar of Saudi Arabia, born 23 August 1986, is the mysterious fashion icon behind “The Mask” and the first fashionisto to appear on media professionally in Saudi Arabia as an artistic character and fashion persona.

He has managed to earn spots in several well-known magazines, newspapers and other forms of media with his individuality and uniqueness.

Early life

Nahar was born in Riyadh, Saudi Arabia.

Acting and Modeling 

Nahar began performing as an actor in school plays when he was a student at the Dar Al Uloom school, from which he graduated in summer 2004.

After several commercial campaigns Nahar did, in 2005 Nahar was approached by the Saudi author Meshal Alrasheed to play a roles in several kids' Saudi theater performances. Wa Al Nass Nyam was one of Nahar's successful plays.

The Mask 

Nahar says he believes that every artist or creative person must have his own personality and each artist must have a character.<ref>[http://www.bazaar-magazine.com/baz/bazaar/index.php?show=eIndex&show_filter=view&action=article&art_id=ART00000002318 Bazzar Magazine, NAHAR UNMASKS STYLE, May 1, 2014]</ref> The concept of the mask speaks a lot, because it is not just about artistic charisma but also has an important message on self-awareness. The message behind the mask is that the form in which God created us is outside our control, so we have to focus on what we wear and the look we choose to present ourselves in front of others.okaz Newspaper, التمــرد بالأقنعة, January 12, 2010
Sayidaty Magazine, behind the scenes, January 11, 2013

 Fashion career 

 

The group suddenly got the attention and a huge number of followers started to notice the differences, and thus he became famous among the young Saudis, which made his name appear in headlines through several newspapers and magazines both local and international.

After many studies and much research Nahar did about the Saudi fashion industry, Nahar decided to bring some new goals and visions into the Saudi fashion such as: helping Saudi community in establishing a language of fashion and to grow within the GCC, correct all the misunderstandings about fashion industry among Saudi society, to come up with ideas and destroy all misunderstandings about fashion and bad habits in people through the way they dress and look, to help the youth and the new generation to know how they should represent their personality through their clothes. “The way you style yourself is the way you present your personality.” -- Nahar in support of new brands (Planning, Marketing, Advertising).

1st Saudi fashion commercial

In 2012 Nahar released the 1st ever Saudi Fashion Commercial on YouTube. 

The New Face for Harvey Nichols

In 2012 Harvey Nichols decide to buy Nahar's Commercial and sign with him to be the face for their new campaign for the men's department as the 1st and only Saudi male, followed by many other project such as Mini Chic By Nahar in 2013, Mix&Match by Nahar in 2012Harvey Nichols Riyadh,Nahar for AW Collection Harvey Nichols, Riyadh, October 24, 2012 and working at the Best of Britain Fashion Show as an art director in 2013.

Local Brands & Companies

After his success with Harvey Nichols in 2012, Nahar collaborated with Nosh Designs' Local Brand on a designing workshop for the brand. In 2013 Nahar signed up with "T-Shirt Art Company" as fashion & creative director for their collection for both spring/summer and fall/winter seasons in 2013.

In 2014 Nahar signed with 38 Store as a creative director and host for their Nahar Triangle event in Riyadh.

Kuwait

In 2014 Nahar decided to extend his work when he was approached by the Kuwait fashion industry's 7 Media. He collaborated with ALOSTOURA, one of the biggest Kuwaiti fashion companies, on a project called Nahar's Picks.

TV appearances

Nahar was also featured on an episode of the TV show Sabah Alkeer Ya Arab'' on MBC television in 2013.

References

External links
 
 
 
 

1986 births
Living people